Fundulopanchax is a genus of killifish living in near-coastal fresh water streams and lakes in Western Africa. All species were previously biologically classified as members of the genus Aphyosemion, with the exception of Fundulopanchax avichang, F. gresensi and F. kamdemi, which were all scientifically described after the major revision of the Aphyosemion complex.

Etymology
The name Fundulopanchax is composed of the names of two other genera of killifish, Fundulus Lacépède (1803), which was the genus the type species was originally placed in and Panchax Valenciennes (1846), as this genus is somewhat intermediate between Fundulus and Aplocheilus in characters.

Species 
There are currently 26 recognized species in this genus:

 Fundulopanchax amieti (Radda, 1976) (Amiet's lyretail)
 Fundulopanchax arnoldi (Boulenger, 1908) (Arnold's killi)
 Fundulopanchax avichang Malumbres & Castelo, 2001
 Fundulopanchax cinnamomeus (Clausen, 1963) (cinnamon killi)
 Fundulopanchax deltaensis (Radda, 1976) (Delta killi)
 Fundulopanchax fallax (C. G. E. Ahl, 1935) (Kribi killi)
 Fundulopanchax filamentosus Meinken, 1933 (plumed lyretail)
 Fundulopanchax gardneri (Boulenger, 1911)
 Fundulopanchax gardneri gardneri (Boulenger, 1911) (blue lyretail)
 Fundulopanchax gardneri lacustris (Langton, 1974) (Ejagham killi)
 Fundulopanchax gardneri mamfensis (Radda, 1974) (Mamfe killi)
 Fundulopanchax gardneri nigerianus (Clausen, 1963) (Nigerian killi)
 Fundulopanchax gresensi Berkenkamp, 2003
 Fundulopanchax gularis (Boulenger, 1902) (gulare)
 Fundulopanchax intermittens (Radda, 1974)
 Fundulopanchax kamdemi Akum, Sonnenberg, Van der Zee & Wildekamp, 2007
 Fundulopanchax marmoratus (Radda, 1973) (marbled lyretail)
 Fundulopanchax mirabilis (Radda, 1970)
 Fundulopanchax moensis (Radda, 1970)
 Fundulopanchax ndianus (Scheel, 1968)
 Fundulopanchax oeseri (H. Schmidt, 1928)
 Fundulopanchax powelli Van der Zee & Wildekamp, 1994
 Fundulopanchax puerzli (Radda & Scheel, 1974)
 Fundulopanchax robertsoni (Radda & Scheel, 1974)
 Fundulopanchax rubrolabialis (Radda, 1973)
 Fundulopanchax scheeli (Radda, 1970)
 Fundulopanchax sjostedti (Lönnberg, 1895) (blue gularis)
 Fundulopanchax spoorenbergi (Berkenkamp, 1976)
 Fundulopanchax traudeae (Radda, 1971)
 Fundulopanchax walkeri (Boulenger, 1911)

References

 
Nothobranchiidae
Fish of Africa
Freshwater fish genera
Taxa named by George S. Myers